Michael Harden (born February 16, 1959) is a former American football player.  He played college football as a defensive back for the University of Michigan from 1977 to 1979. He then played professional football in the National Football League (NFL) for 11 years as a defensive back for the Denver Broncos from 1980 to 1988 and for the Los Angeles Raiders from 1989 to 1990.

Early years
Harden was born in Memphis, Tennessee, in 1959.  He attended Central High School in Detroit.

University of Michigan
Harden enrolled at the University of Michigan in 1976 and played college football as a defensive back for Bo Schembechler's Michigan Wolverines football teams from 1976 to 1979. In September 1978, Harden and Jerry Meter both intercepted passes thrown by Joe Montana to help secure a 28–14 victory over Notre Dame. He was selected as a first-team defensive back on the 1978 All-Big Ten Conference football team.  Over the course of his collegiate career, Harden had 89 tackles, 42 assists, 6 interceptions and 95 return yards, 16 pass breakups, and 3 fumble recoveries.  Harden also returned 24 punts for 156 yards.

Professional football
Harden was selected by the Denver Broncos in the fifth round (131st overall pick) of the 1980 NFL Draft. He appeared in 128 games, 98 as a starter, at the safety and cornerback positions for the Broncos from 1980 to 1988.  He intercepted 33 passes in his nine years with the Broncos.

Harden was fined $5,000 for a hit in the opening game of the 1988 season against division rival Seattle Seahawks that knocked out Steve Largent and resulted in a concussion and the loss of two teeth. Fourteen weeks later, in Seattle, Harden intercepted a Dave Krieg pass in the end zone and returned it twenty-five yards before being knocked off his feet by Largent and fumbling the football, which Largent also pounced on, giving the Seahawks possession again. Largent later said in an interview that the hit was retaliation in part for the hit that Harden gave Largent earlier in the season.

Harden concluded his career with the Los Angeles Raiders during the 1989 and 1990 seasons. During his 11-year NFL career, he intercepted 38 passes for 663 yards and 4 touchdowns, and recovered 14 fumbles. , his 179 interception return yards in 1986 is a Broncos record. On special teams, Harden returned 8 punts for 113 yards and a touchdown and returned 26 kickoffs for 414 yards.

Personal life
Harden has 3 children, Taler (May 1985), Chanel (May 1995), and Alexander (January 1997). Harden is also the grandfather of four.

In 2003, he was sentenced to six (6) years in prison for stealing from several women.

References

1959 births
Living people
American football cornerbacks
American football safeties
Denver Broncos players
Michigan Wolverines football players
Oakland Raiders players
Players of American football from Memphis, Tennessee
African-American players of American football
21st-century African-American people
20th-century African-American sportspeople